Likasi is a commune of the city of Likasi in the Democratic Republic of the Congo.

Populated places in Haut-Katanga Province
Communes of the Democratic Republic of the Congo